Hung Hom Bay is one of the 25 constituencies in the Kowloon City District of Hong Kong which was created in 2015.

The constituency loosely covers areas of Royal Peninsula and Whampoa Estate in Hung Hom with the estimated population of 18,414.

Councillors represented

Election results

2010s

2000s

Notes

References

Constituencies of Hong Kong
Constituencies of Kowloon City District Council
1994 establishments in Hong Kong
Constituencies established in 1994
Hung Hom